Josina van de Wijdeven (born 29 March 1954), known as José Hoebee, is a Dutch pop singer. She was a member of Luv', a famous Dutch girl group in the late 1970s and early 1980s that scored hits in more than 15 countries. In late 1981, she went solo and was successful in her homeland and in the Flanders region of Belgium between 1982 and 1985. She formed a duo known as Bonnie & José with Bonnie St. Claire to record Dutch cover versions of ABBA's songs.

Luv' went through line-up changes and reunited several times. On 7 February 2020 the group's management announced that Luv' would stop all their activities due to José's ill health.

Career
Hoebee started her career as a professional singer in the early 1970s as a member of a folk & country band, Young Tradition, formed with her two sisters. This formation took part in talent shows, changed its name into Elongi and recorded a single produced by Piet Souer, who later suggested that Hoebee join Luv'.

In 1976, she became a member of girl group Luv' with Patty Brard and Marga Scheide. She chose José Andreoli as an artist name. From 1977 to 1981, Luv' scored a string of hit records in the Benelux countries, Germany, Switzerland, Austria, Denmark, France, South Africa, New Zealand and Mexico. In March 1981, the group announced its first dissolution. The pop formation reunited later on several occasions.

After Luv' split up, Hoebee went solo, gave up her artist name (José Andreoli) and married record producer Will Hoebee. The wedding reception took place in David Soul's villa in Los Angeles. Her new career was less international than the one she had as a Luv' member. Artistically, she chose a repertoire featuring a majority of cover versions of pop standards, including "I Will Follow Him", with the help of her husband. Her first album The Good Times was produced by Pim Koopman and released in 1982.

Twelve of her singles (among them a #1 hit and duets) entered the record charts; twelve in the Netherlands and five in Flanders. Hoebee was the first female singer who had #1 hits on the Dutch Top 40 as a member of a group (Luv') and as a solo artist. Diana Ross (of the Supremes), Yvonne Keeley (of the Star Sisters), Melanie C (of the Spice Girls), Sita (of K-Otic) and Beyoncé (of Destiny's Child) later established the same record in the hit parade.

After the birth of her son Tim (on 14 October 1985), Hoebee slowed down her career. She retired from show business in 1989 to devote herself to her family. Four years later, she made a brief comeback with Luv' and then escaped from entertainment again to live with her relatives in Best, a village near Eindhoven. For one year and a half, she was the owner of a video rental shop (The Movie Store) that she sold in the summer of 2003.

Then, with the help from Corry Konings (a popular singer in the Netherlands) and her management agency (CK Produkties), Hoebee decided to go back on stage. Her live shows attracted fans who had not seen her for years. In early 2004, she recorded under the pseudonym Stuff a dance-oriented cover version of a Four Tops hit ("Walk Away Renée"). Moreover, she sang two tracks as a guest artist on a tribute album to Doris Day (Marjan Berger meets Doris Day). She later left CK Produkties and signed a deal with WVS Management. This transfer was accompanied by Hoebee's move from the Netherlands to Lommel, Flanders, Belgium.

In the fall of 2004, Hoebee hosted a music talent contest show (Tijd Voor Muziek) on a Dutch local channel (VSM TV). Her husband collaborated on the production of this programme.

In 2005, WVS Music released her first compilation Alle Hits & Unieke Bonustracks. This anthology includes the singer's greatest hits, b-sides, album tracks and bonus tracks. In 2009, she has covered "Be My Baby", rendered as a duet with former BZN member Anny Schilder and produced by Will Hoebee and Piet Souer.

In March 2011, Hoebee re-recorded "I Will Follow Him" with Peggy March who originally had a #1 hit with the song in 1963. The two singers appeared on several Dutch television programmes. The release of the song, however, was delayed one year later and finally came out on the German edition of March's album Always And Forever together with an original track "My Christmas Wish".

On 10 June 2012 José's husband Will Hoebee died and it took her months to recover.

In January 2013, she took part in Sterren Dansen Op Het Ijs (SBS 6 celebrity figure skating show). She was rapidly eliminated from the competition but the artist considered it as a great learning experience.

In June 2014, Hoebee released "Noheyo", a cover version of a 2011 single by Polish band Blue Café. This single quickly became a #1 hit on SBS 6 download chart in the "Dutch-speaking" category.

September 2014 saw the re-issue of "Who's Sorry Now?" (a song she recorded 10 years earlier and made famous by Connie Francis in the late 1950s).

In the 2000s and 2010s, she toured the nostalgia circuit with Luv'. Due to her ill health, the group announced its break-up on 7 February 2020.

Bonnie & José: the ABBA project
In 1984, she formed with Bonnie St. Claire a duo credited as Bonnie & José. The two vocalists recorded a Dutch cover version of ABBA's "Cassandra", which became a Top 40 hit in the Netherlands in the summer of 1984. A few months later, Bonnie & José were involved in the ABBAcadabra project (a TV musical for children based on songs of ABBA). Bonnie played the role of Sleeping Beauty and José had the role of Snow White. Other Dutch celebrities took part in this music show: Marga Scheide of Luv' (as "Carabosse/the Bad Fairy"), Ron Brandsteder (Patty Brard's first husband) and Benny Neyman.

In 1985, Bonnie & José recorded a whole LP (entitled Herinnering) with ABBA songs. This opus contained another Top 40 hit: "Zoals Vrienden Doen" ("The Way Old Friends Do"). In 1986, in order to promote the Herinnering album, the duo taped a TV special in Sweden: Bonnie en José in Zweden aired on the NCRV channel. The two singers were filmed in Stockholm (including a scene in the Polar Music Studios, ABBA's recording studios). Björn Ulvaeus was interviewed for this special and acknowledged the Bonnie & José's initiative.
After the broadcast of this show, they performed sporadically on TV and on stage, even with a non-ABBA repertoire but no new records were released. In 1987, they broke up. Eight years later, they made a comeback by recording a single "'n Engel Als Jij" (a cover version of a German song: "Engel Wie Du" originally sung by Juliane Werding, Maggie Reilly and Viktor Lazlo). In December 2004, Hoebee acted as a witness at Bonnie's wedding (aired live on SBS 6, a Dutch TV channel).

In the summer of 2013, Bonnie & José relaunched their duo for several performances but ended their collaboration in early 2014.

On 20 November 2020 the independent label CD-Licious reissued the Herinnering album on CD and DVD thanks to a crowdfunding campaign. The 2020 edition of this CD included bonus tracks in addition to the original track listing. The DVD contained the "Bonnie en José in Zweden" TV special as well as bonus videos.

Background vocals
Hoebee worked as a backup singer for other artists including:
 Babe: "Tick-A-Thums-My-Heart" (performed with Marga Scheide and produced by Hans van Hemert) – taken from the album Blitzers (TTR, 1981)
 David Soul: "That’s enough for me" – taken from the album The Best Days of My Life (Philips, 1981)
 Doris D & The Pins: "I wanna be loved by you", "The Marvellous Marionettes", "Bad luck Honey", "Higher and Higher" – taken from the album Doris D and the Pins (Utopia, 1981)
 Bloem: "Ik wil alleen bij jou zijn", "Omdat" – taken from the album Bloemstukken (CNR, 1982)
 Lucy Steymel: "Midnight", "Red-handed", "You’re breaking my heart woman", "Night without you" – taken from the album Three's A Charm (CBS, 1982)
 Nancy Dubbeldeman:  "Tonight you belong to me" (Carrere, 1983)
 Dianne Marchal: "It’s my time now" (Carrere, 1983)
 Benny Neyman: "Een dag in Parijs" – taken from the album Het Zwarte Goud (CNR, 1984)
 Tina Selini: "I know about you", "All of my life", "Just in Time" – taken from the album Tina Selini (RCA, 1988)
 Nikos Ignatiadis: "Timmy’s song" – taken from the album The Olympous Symphony (CNR, 1988)
 Johan Vlemmix: "Neuro van de euro" (Hollandia Music, 2016)

Discography

Singles 
 "Elongi" (Philips, 1976)
 "I'm So Sorry" (Carrere, 1981)
 "I Will Follow Him" (Carrere, 1982)
 "Secret Love" (Carrere, 1982)
 "The Good Times" (Carrere, 1982)
 "I Can Hear Music" (Carrere, 1983)
 "Hey Now, Watcha Gonna Do" (Carrere, 1983)
 "So Long, Marianne" (with Ron Brandsteder, CNR, 1984)
 "Time Goes By" (Carrere, 1984)
 "Cassandra" (with Bonnie St. Claire, Philips, 1984)
 "Wij Zijn Vrij" (taken from the ABBAcadabra TV musical, Indisc, 1984)
 "I Love You" (CNR, 1984)
 "Zoals Vrienden Doen" (with Bonnie St. Claire, RCA, 1985)
 "Waarom" (with Bonnie St. Claire, RCA, 1985)
 "De Flierefluiter" (with Bonnie St. Claire, RCA, 1986)
 "Herinnering" (with Bonnie St. Claire, RCA, 1986)
 "All Around My Hat" (RCA, 1986)
 "In The Sign of Love" (Corduroy, 1987)
 "N Engel Als Jij" (with Bonnie St. Claire, Bunny Music Bucs/Dino, 1994)
 "Walk Away Renée" (as STUFF, download on internet, 2003)
 "I Will Follow Him" (WVS Music, 2006)
 "Be My Baby" (Marista, 2009)
 "My Christmas Wish" (with Peggy March, Night Dance Records, digital single, 2012)
 "Noheyo" (MAP Records, digital single, 2014)
 "Who's Sorry Now?" (Hit It! Music, digital single, 2014)

Albums 
 The Good Times (Carrere, 1982)
 Herinnering (with Bonnie St. Claire, RCA, 1985) – reissue on CD/DVD (CD-Licious, 2020)
 Alle Hits & Unieke Bonustracks (compilation, WVS Music, 2005)

Guest appearances on other albums:
 Niet Alleen by Ron Brandsteder (CNR, 1983 / including "So Long Marianne")
 Abbacadabra (Dutch version, Indisc, 1984)
 Nederland Muziekland – 14 'Nooitgedachte' Hoogtepunten (CNR, 1986)
 Wie Gaat Er Me Naar Dinoland(Dino, 1993)
 Marjan Berger Meets Doris Day(2003)
 Always and Forever by Peggy March (2012 reissue, Night Dance Records/DA-Music / including a new version of "I Will Follow Him" and "My Christmas Wish")

Notable record charts

References

External links
 
 Blog about José Hoebee 

1954 births
Living people
Dutch pop singers
English-language singers from the Netherlands
Musicians from North Brabant
People from Best, Netherlands
20th-century Dutch women singers
21st-century Dutch women singers
21st-century Dutch singers